Earl of Orford is a title that has been created three times.

The first creation came in the Peerage of England in 1697 when the naval commander Admiral of the Fleet Edward Russell was made Earl of Orford, in the County of Suffolk. He was created Baron of Shingay, in the County of Cambridge, and Viscount Barfleur at the same time, also in the Peerage of England. A member of the influential Russell family, he was the son of the Honourable Edward Russell, a younger son of Francis Russell, 4th Earl of Bedford and younger brother of William Russell, 1st Duke of Bedford (see Duke of Bedford for earlier history of the Russell family). Lord Orford had no children and the titles became extinct on his death in 1727.

The title was created again in the Peerage of Great Britain in 1742 for Sir Robert Walpole, de facto acknowledged to have been the first Prime Minister of Great Britain, who at the same time was created Viscount Walpole and Baron Walpole of Houghton. The titles became extinct on the death of the 4th Earl in 1797.

It was created a third time in the Peerage of the United Kingdom in 1806 for Horatio Walpole, 4th Baron Walpole of Walpole, a cousin of the 4th Earl of the 2nd creation. The title became extinct in 1931.

Earls of Orford, first creation (1697)
Edward Russell, 1st Earl of Orford (1652–1727)

Family tree

Earls of Orford, second creation (1742)
 Robert Walpole, 1st Earl of Orford (1676–1745)
 Robert Walpole, 2nd Earl of Orford (1701–1751) 
 George Walpole, 3rd Earl of Orford (1730–1791)
 Horace Walpole, 4th Earl of Orford (1717–1797)

Earls of Orford, third creation (1806)
 Horatio Walpole, 1st Earl of Orford (1723–1809)
 Horatio Walpole, 2nd Earl of Orford (1752–1822)
 Horatio Walpole, 3rd Earl of Orford (1783–1858)
 Horatio William Walpole, 4th Earl of Orford (1813–1894)
 Robert Horace Walpole, 5th Earl of Orford (1854–1931)

See also 
 Baron Walpole
 Orford, Suffolk
 Houghton Hall
 Wolterton Hall

References

 
1697 establishments in England
1727 disestablishments in England
1742 establishments in Great Britain
1797 disestablishments in Great Britain
1806 establishments in the United Kingdom
1931 disestablishments in the United Kingdom
Extinct earldoms in the Peerage of England
Extinct earldoms in the Peerage of Great Britain
Extinct earldoms in the Peerage of the United Kingdom
Noble titles created in 1697
Noble titles created in 1742
Noble titles created in 1806
Earl
Peerages created for the Prime Minister of the United Kingdom